The Prinos oil field is an oil field located in the northern Aegean Sea, between the island of Thasos and city of Kavala on the mainland. It was discovered in 1971 by the Oceanic Exploration company of Denver. The field was developed by Energean Oil & Gas. It began production in 1974. It was named after the village of Prinos on Thasos, the nearest inhabited place.

However, by 2020 it has delivered some 120 million barrels of crude, exceeding the original estimate.

The output of the field was loss-making for the company and in 2020, the Energean Oil & Gas asked for the government support.

See also

 Energy in Greece

References

Oil fields in Greece